The Vancouver WCT, also known by its sponsored name Rothmans International, was a men's tennis tournament held at the PNE Agrodome in Vancouver, British Columbia, Canada from 1970 to 1973.   The event was part of the WCT Tour and was played in indoor carpet courts. The tournament was cancelled in July 1973 due to diminishing interest and decreasing attendance.

Finals

Singles

Doubles

References

External links
 ATP Tour results archive

World Championship Tennis
Recurring sporting events established in 1970
1973 disestablishments in British Columbia
Defunct tennis tournaments in Canada
Tennis in British Columbia
Recurring sporting events disestablished in 1973
1970 establishments in British Columbia